To date, the Bible has not been completely translated into Lowland Scots. In 1513-39 Murdoch Nisbet, associated with a group of Lollards, wrote a Scots translation of the New Testament, working from John Purvey's Wycliffite Bible. However, this work remained unpublished, in manuscript form, and was known only to his family and Bible scholars. It was published by the Scottish Text Society in 1901–5. The first direct translation of a book of the Bible from one of the original languages, rather than a pre-existing English model was Peter Hately Waddell's The Psalms: frae Hebrew intil Scottis, published in 1871.

William Lorimer, a noted classical scholar, produced the first New Testament translation into modern Scots from the original koine Greek (though, in an appendix, when Satan speaks to Christ, he is quoted in Standard English), and this work too was published posthumously, in 1983.

The Gospel of Luke has been published in Ulster Scots under the title Guid Wittins Frae Doctèr Luik. It was published in 2009 by Ullans Press, with the copyright held by the Ulster-Scots Language Society.

See also
 Bible translations into Scottish Gaelic
 Miscellaneous English Bible translations and Modern English Bible translations

References

Scots
Christianity in Scotland
Scots-language works
Scottish translators
Church of Scotland